Nyssosternus duidaensis is a species of beetle in the family Cerambycidae, the only species in the genus Nyssosternus.

References

Acanthocinini